Frank Melvin McPhee (March 19, 1931 - March 31, 2011) was an American football defensive back who played one season with the Chicago Cardinals of the National Football League (NFL). He was drafted by the Cardinals in the thirteenth round of the 1953 NFL Draft. McPhee played college football at Princeton University and attended Chaney High School in Youngstown, Ohio. He was a Consensus All-American in 1952. He also served in the United States Marines.

References

External links
Just Sports Stats

1931 births
2011 deaths
Players of American football from Youngstown, Ohio
American football defensive backs
American football ends
Princeton Tigers football players
Chicago Cardinals players
All-American college football players
United States Marines